In mathematics, particularly in linear algebra, the Schur product theorem states that the Hadamard product of two positive definite matrices is also a positive definite matrix.
The result is named after Issai Schur (Schur 1911, p. 14, Theorem VII) (note that Schur signed as J. Schur in Journal für die reine und angewandte Mathematik.)

We remark that the converse of the theorem holds in the following sense. If  is a symmetric matrix and the Hadamard product  is positive definite for all positive definite matrices , then  itself is positive definite.

Proof

Proof using the trace formula 

 

 

This shows that  is a positive definite matrix.

Proof using Gaussian integration

Case of M = N 

Let  be an -dimensional centered Gaussian random variable with covariance .

 

Using Wick's theorem to develop  we have

 

Since a covariance matrix is positive definite, this proves that the matrix with elements  is a positive definite matrix.

General case 

Let  and  be -dimensional centered Gaussian random variables with covariances ,  and independent from each other so that we have
  for any 

 

Using Wick's theorem to develop
 

 

Since a covariance matrix is positive definite, this proves that the matrix with elements  is a positive definite matrix.

Proof using eigendecomposition

Proof of positive semidefiniteness 

Then
 

Each  is positive semidefinite (but, except in the 1-dimensional case, not positive definite, since they are rank 1 matrices).  Also,  thus the sum  is also positive semidefinite.

Proof of definiteness 

To show that the result is positive definite requires even further proof. We shall show that for any vector , we have . For this we observe that
 

Thus its square is positive. This completes the proof.

References

External links 
 Bemerkungen zur Theorie der beschränkten Bilinearformen mit unendlich vielen Veränderlichen at EUDML

Linear algebra
Matrix theory